George Varghese is an Indian film director working in the Malayalam film industry.

Career
Varghese started his career working as an assistant director to filmmakers like Joshy, M. Padmakumar, Anil C Menon etc. He made his directorial debut in 2010 with the Prithviraj starrer Thanthonni.

Filmography
Thanthonni (2010)

References

Living people
Malayalam film directors
Film directors from Kerala
Year of birth missing (living people)